Gonzalo García Téllez, known as Lalo García (20 March 1971 – March 2015) was a Spanish basketball player. García played his entire career for CB Valladolid, his hometown club, and played for the Spanish national team.

On March 4, 2015, García left his home for a walk, without carrying any papers or phone. He was reported missing the following day.  On March 31, García's body was found in the Pisuerga river.

References

1971 births
2015 deaths
CB Valladolid players
Liga ACB players
Spanish men's basketball players